Shlomo HaKohen (1828–1905) was an Av Beis Din (chief justice of a rabbinical court) and posek (decider of Jewish law) of Vilna.

He was born in 1828 to Yisroel Moshe HaCohen, a judge in the rabbinic court in Vilna.

His glosses on the Talmud were published in the Vilna Edition Shas under the name "Cheshek Shlomo" (חשק שלמה). His halachik responsa were published under the title "Binyan Shlomo" (שו"ת בנין שלמה).

HaKohen corresponded with Chaim Hezekiah Medini, who praised and quoted him in his work, Sdei Chemed.

His responsa have gained a position of prominence in halachic literature, and are frequently quoted.

He was the editor of the Vilna Edition Shas, where he pored through various manuscripts to verify and establish an accurate version of the Talmud without the mistakes so prevalent in previous editions of the Talmud. As a critical scholar, HaKohen researched the text of Ketuvim based on various writings of the Vilna Gaon.

HaCohen was allegedly an enthusiastic supporter of the Mizrachi Religious Zionism movement. However, claims that he honored Theodor Herzl by greeting him with a Torah scroll in hand and described him as the equivalent of the Jewish kings of the Biblical era are false.

HaKohen was a great-grandfather of Nochum Partzovitz.

External links
 Responsa Binyan Shlomo (Volume 1, Volume 2)
 Responsa ''Atzei Broshim (on Yoreh Deah)

References

Kohanim writers of Rabbinic literature
Lithuanian Orthodox rabbis
1828 births
1905 deaths
Rabbis from Vilnius
19th-century Lithuanian rabbis
Authors of books on Jewish law